The 4th BRDC International Trophy meeting was held on 10 May 1952 at the Silverstone Circuit, Northamptonshire. The race was run to Formula Two regulations, and was held over two heats of 15 laps each, followed by a final race of 35 laps. British driver Lance Macklin, driving an HWM-Alta won the final. Mike Hawthorn in a Cooper T20-Bristol was the fastest qualifier, and Rudi Fischer in a Ferrari 500 set overall fastest lap.

Results

Final – 35 Laps

 Fastest lap: Peter Whitehead/Mike Hawthorn – 1:59.0

Heats – 15 Laps

References

BRDC International Trophy
BRDC International Trophy
BRDC International Trophy
BRDC International Trophy